For Men Only (translit.Lel Regal Fakat) is a 1964 Egyptian romantic comedy film  written and directed by Mahmoud Zulfikar.

Cast
 Nadia Lutfi as Elham/Mustafa
 Soad Hosny as Salwa/Hassan
 Hassan Youssef as Fawzi
 Ihab Nafea as Ahmed
 Amal Ramzy as Fekria
 Youssef Shaaban as Amin
 Souheir Magdy

See also
 Cinema of Egypt
 Lists of Egyptian films
 List of Egyptian films of 1964
 List of Egyptian films of the 1960s

References

External links
 
 For Men Only on elCinema

1960s Arabic-language films
1964 films
1964 romantic comedy films
Egyptian romantic comedy films
Films directed by Mahmoud Zulfikar
Egyptian black-and-white films
Films shot in Egypt